Pitamber may refer to:

 Pitamber Das, Indian politician
 Pitambar Tarai , Oriya poet
 Pitambar Deva Goswami, Assamese social reformer
 Pitambar Charairongba, Hindu ruler of Manipur
 Pitambar Paswan, Indian politician
 Nilamber-Pitamber University in Jharkhand
 Pitambar, a 1992 Bollywood film

Hindu given names
Indian masculine given names